John Birch (1922 – 6 November 2000) was an English luthier mainly known for his electric guitars. His customers included Tony Iommi and Geezer Butler of Black Sabbath, Brian May of Queen, Manny Charlton of Nazareth, Dave Hill and Jim Lea of Slade, Gerry Shephard of The Glitter Band, Roy Orbison and Nicky Panicci.

Early life and career
John Birch was born in West Bridgford, Nottinghamshire, United Kingdom in 1922. He became involved in guitar building as a Royal Air Force officer based in the South Pacific Islands in World War II. Returning to England at the end of the war his interest musically was in collecting Hawaiian Records.

In 1963 he met Basil and Pat Henriques of the "Waikiki Islanders" group, a Hawaiian group formed by Pat's father Bill Cox and his brother Archie in 1937. Birch was, during the '60s, living at 33 Innage Road Northfield and working as a field service engineer for Ampex VTRs.

After a series of experiments with a few joint designs Basil Henriques and Birch (using Henriques' Fender 1000 pedal steel guitar as a testbed) came up with a new pickup design using multiple polepieces and a coil potted in baked epoxy resin. On subsequent BBC "Night Ride" broadcasts and later EMI Abbey Road recordings, the pickups on Basil's guitar proved to be a revolutionary design in both sustain and fidelity. EMI were so impressed with the stereo sound of Basil's guitar that they offered Basil and the Waikiki Islanders a 10-year contract on their Stereo Label "Studio Two Stereo".

At Basil's instigation, John quit his day job and started making pickups for the guitarists in the local Birmingham beat group scene. Much later on (in the late '80s) John was again to use a pedal steel guitar as a testbed, this time for a MIDI pickup system.

Biography
After the war was over, he came back to Nottingham and started a business modifying existing guitars. Beginning in the 1960s, he mostly worked with Gibsons, an example of which is the white Gibson SG Junior Leslie West of Mountain gave to Tony Iommi (the guitar is currently owned by Greg Dorsett of Rock Stars Guitars). He eventually started building his own guitars. Later he moved his shop/factory to a large house at 106 New Road in Rubery, near Birmingham GB.

Birch started to advertise his parts, pickups, and guitar customization in a magazine called Beat International in the late 1960s. John Diggins saw one of these ads and showed one of his custom guitars to John Birch. Diggins was offered a job and became part of Birch's workshop. Arthur Baker came in as a production manager, breaking down the various jobs around the shop to create an assembly-line-like process. Birch was mainly in charge of electronics and pickup making while Diggins mostly took care of woodworking. There were many other employees through the years, though the roles stayed largely the same.

The very first guitars that were made completely in shop were SG- or Les-Paul-shaped, featured 24-fret fingerboards, and a black or white finish. At first, the fingerboards were Brazilian rosewood, but eventually the expensive and rare Brazilian Rosewood was replaced with more plentiful and cheap maple fingerboards.

The majority of the shop's guitars, like those of most small outfits meeting the demands of players during the British Invasion, were built quickly and on the cheap. John Diggins, however, was a master craftsman and always built top-notch instruments at the shop.

Customers

Tony Iommi of Black Sabbath came to Birch's shop after having his ideas rejected by the major guitar manufacturers of the time, such as Gibson and Fender. Iommi was looking for someone to make him a guitar with a 24-fret fingerboard and high-power/low-noise pickups. Iommi's red Gibson SG Special received some modification in the form of a re-covered Gibson P-90 in the bridge position and John Birch's own Superflux in the neck position. This guitar is in the Times Square Hard Rock Cafe. In 1975, Birch built Iommi his black 24-fret, cross-inlay SG Special. This was the main guitar used on the albums Technical Ecstasy, Never Say Die, Heaven and Hell, and Mob Rules. This guitar is now in the Miami Hard Rock Cafe. Around the same time Birch's SG was built, John Diggins also built Iommi's Jaydee SG, which features a custom-wound pickup by Diggins in the bridge position and a standard Biflux in the neck position. The guitar also has peeled and cracked paint due to a rushed finish job. During the Cross Purposes tour, the guitar was left in a hot car on a date in Brazil, and the finish bubbled and cracked due to the heat. This guitar was first used for some overdubbing on Heaven and Hell, but quickly became Iommi's main guitar. The Birch shop also built a guitar for Tony that featured the ability to remove and replace pickups. The pickups plugged through the back into slots which had quick connectors that allowed them to be pulled and replaced easily, and didn't require any soldering. This allowed for more tonal options than any standard guitar, no matter how complex its wiring. Geezer Butler also had some basses made by Birch, one of which can be seen in the music video for Black Sabbath's "Hard Road."

Manny Charlton of Nazareth used John Birch to customise a Gibson Flying-V guitar which he had purchased in Tucson, Arizona during 1976. John Birch added Di Marzio Super Distortion Humbuckers, an out-of-phase switch, Gibson TP-6 fine tuning tailpiece, a flash metal scratch plate and refinished it to a dark sunburst colour. This guitar appears on Nazareth's albums Playin' the Game (1976) and Expect No Mercy (1977) and can be heard on the recordings of "Somebody to Roll", "Kentucky Fried Blues", "Down Home Girl" and "Flying". It was used on many Nazareth tours in the late 1970s and was in Manny Charlton's possession until April 2015, when it was sold to Helge Rognstad (guitarist with The Fluffy Jackets). John Birch also customised another Gibson guitar that Manny Charlton used to favor in the 1970s. This was a Gibson Les Paul that started out life as a '50s Gold Top before Manny bought in the states around 75-76. John Birch sprayed this guitar black and fitted it with his own bridge design. He also fitted it with Alembic-designed hot-rod magnets in the pickups. Manny used this guitar for several years until in "a moment of insanity" according to himself: In the middle of the '80s whammy bar craze he had a Kahler Tremolo fitted to it, and "destroyed a wonderful guitar".

Another of Birch's famous customers was Brian May of Queen. Brian wanted a copy of his Red Special to use as a backup guitar, so he asked John to make him what would come to be referred to as the "Yellow Special." This is the guitar that was used on several videos from the album News of the World and the video for "We Will Rock You." May never liked the Yellow Special's sound or feel. The construction of the Birch guitar and his original Red Special are very different. May's Red Special is constructed of mahogany and oak with a frictionless roller bridge, whereas the Birch guitar used all-maple construction with an ebony fingerboard, as well as a non-roller bridge which meant tuning was unstable. At a concert during the Hot Space Tour in the early eighties, he broke a string on the Red Special. After using the Birch guitar for a few minutes, he became frustrated because the tuning stability on the guitar was very poor. He tossed it offstage out of frustration, but no-one was there to catch it. The guitar neck was completely separated from the body. Fortunately, all the pieces were saved, and the remains can be seen at Brian May's site (link at bottom). Until a few years ago, John Birch still offered a copy of the guitar featuring Dimarzio's Brian May pickups, but the model has been discontinued.

Roy Orbison also ordered a guitar from Birch. In 1975, Orbison's guitarist, Allen Panter was having problems with his Les Paul. Orbison was also having difficulty with his Ovation, and needed it to be repaired. Orbison was satisfied with the work done, and decided to have a custom guitar built. Orbison, Birch, and Birch employee John Diggins all had discussions on what Roy would like to have built. The Eagle guitar was born, and it can be seen at Jaydee's website (link at bottom) while the actual guitar hung on the wall at Birmingham Hard Rock Cafe until its closure in 2006.

Dave Hill of Slade has used John Birch guitars since the mid-seventies. Among the many modified Gibsons and John Birch originals Hill used throughout the 1970s and 1980s were a J1-style maple guitar featuring Hyperflux pickups and, of course, the famous Super Yob guitar, which is styled after a Sci-Fi ray gun. Hill has said he didn't really like using the Super Yob due to its neck-heavy nature, its poor sound, and terribly high action. Hill then had a copy built for him by Framus. Recently, the new John Birch company released a 50-guitar run of the new version that features LED lights in the neck inlays.

The Glitter Band's glitter-covered star-shaped guitar was built, according to Gerry Shephard, by John Birch in mid-1975 for the release of The Glitter Band's "Love in the Sun". He also repaired Shephard's old gold-coloured star guitar, which had been damaged at a show by some overzealous fans. The cost of the new guitar was £400. The guitar received more damage over the years, but was fully repaired in 1996 by Ray Cooper. The guitar was used mostly by Gerry Shephard, and retired with him in 2002. He built a reversed Stratocaster model with two JB pickups and hollow fret cavities for Ritchie Blackmore.

In 1972, Lance Fogg of UK cult band Complex came to John to revitalise his Rickenbacker 4001 bass. John replaced the bass pickup with one of his Hyperflux pickups, rewound the treble pickup, set up the action and completed the bass in a snow white finish. It remained a trademark of Complex through to 1979.

Birch also built the Rook guitar for Rook Music, which can be seen, along with Framus's copy of the Super Yob, in Tony Bacon's The Ultimate Guitar Book. The Rook guitar was designed to emulate a rook chesspiece, complete with a simulated brick texture made of cork and a front gate made of fretwire.

The last guitar that John Birch himself worked on was a replica of the Birch bass used by Jim Lea of Slade, owned by Stu Rutter.

Colin Gibb, from ‘Black Lace’ who had been a great lover of ‘custom’ guitars, and a great admirer of John Birch guitars (having borrowed one for the ‘Superman’ video) commissioned the company to build an 8-string bass, in 2001. The instrument was based on what Fender ‘may’ have produced, if they ever made an 8-string, in the 60s, Having a ‘hockey stick’ headstock (similar to the Fender electric 12-string), and chrome control plate (as on the bass V1) but being mainly designed around the Fender Precision Bass.

Nicky Panicci from the School Girls and Ben Harper has a number of one of a kind John birch customs including an interchangeable pickup model like Tony Iommi and the Rarest one off "Star Guitar" with 2 Multiflux pickup a 30 different sound switching capacity .

Guitars
John Birch built many styles such as Flying Vs, SGs, J1s and J2s, Strats and Les Pauls. He even built Rickenbacker 4000-style basses and doublenecks. Also available was a teardrop-shaped guitar, much like the Vox teardrop guitar. Also available, of course, were custom shapes that could go as wild as the customer's imagination.

The guitars also had features that were uncommon for the time, but are now used by many guitar companies, such as 24-fret necks, neck-through construction, as well as his high-gain, low-noise pickups and stainless steel bridges. His truss rods went into a tube-like channel, and steel rods went down to the seventh fret for extra security from headstock breakage, though this made them somewhat neck-heavy. The guitars were also made of solid rock maple, which gave the guitars great sustain and durability.

Pickups
Birch's guitar pickups had a unique construction compared to other pickups of the time. Most commercial pickups use Alnico or ceramic magnets, occasionally samarium-cobalt or even neodymium. Birch used cobalt steel magnets, oversized to make up for their relative weakness as compared to Alnico.

Birch also designed removable pickups to offer an even greater range of tonal options. This was designed in collaboration with Tony Iommi for studio use. John Diggins recalls that "The interchangeable pick-up idea came from Tony. The pick-up routs went all the way through the body, with copper contact points along one edge of the pick-up rout situated near the back of the instrument. The pick-ups were assembled on a plinth, pre-adjusted for height. The pick-up surrounds were fitted to the front of the instrument so that when the modules were slotted in from the back they engaged into the surround at the correct height. The pick-ups were held in place with spring-loaded clips that located into a vee-slot routed into the side of the pick-up cavity. When in place, the pick-up housing was flush with the back of the instrument. Contacts on the pick-ups were also spring-loaded and made contact with the adjacent copper points in the pick-up cavity." When asked Tony Iommi was asked if he still had the patent to the interchangeable pickup system he helped to develop, Iommi said, "I did years ago, but I probably lost it now. That was about 28 years ago. I had just done it for my own interest. If it was successful I knew people would rip it off."

Not many Birch-made interchangeable-pickup guitars are known to exist. Nicky Panicci of David Bowie and USA band S'cool Girls owns one as well.

Apart from the pickups, Birch applied a single-knob bass-cut/treble-cut tone control at all his instruments, equivalent to the controls at 1940/50 Epiphone Electar guitars and early 1950 Gretsch guitars with DeArmond Dynasonic pickups. This "JB-tone" control did not affect the frequency response when set to neutral, unlike the Gretsch and the Epiphone dual tone controls.

All standard guitars like the J1, J2 and SG models are switchable for mono, stereo and anti-phase-mono operation, wired to a stereo phono output connector. The guitars featured unique switching options, having up to seven control knobs for a single-neck guitar. With two Multiflux pickups, there are 22 switching options available, including stereo, in and out of phase, mono, and each pickup acting as a single unit.

End and rebirth of John Birch Guitars
In the late 1970s, copies from Japan and Korea began to sell well in Britain and America. Some were very high-quality for a low price, such as Yamaha's SG2000. Since the average person could have just about any guitar style he could want, the small shop's sales had begun to drop by the early 1980s. Also changes in music trends from classic 70s rock to punk required a less demanding style of playing and demand for quality top end models dropped. John Birch decided to leave the Birmingham workshop and John Diggins set up on his own in 1977, taking Arthur Baker with him.

In 1993, John Carling approached John Birch with intentions to buy Birch's last remaining J1 which he did. John also offered to help John Birch to restart the guitar business as business manager and technician in Nottingham. John Birch accepted and they released new products, such as the Full Range pickups and the MIDI guitar controllers, new versions of the old pickups in standard humbucker size, and a range of guitars that used the most popular body styles of the 1970s and 1980s. It was in this period the new Magnum 2 pickup was developed; after many hours of testing they finally hit the right spot. It has turned out to be one of the finest pickups ever made and is used on the new range of John Birch Guitars.

John Birch died on November 6, 2000 at the age of 78. John Carling decided to continue with the company with the help of master guitar builder Laz Gajic.

New John Birch Company
John Birch Guitars continues to make fine guitars under the direction of Birch's business partner, John Carling. Their new line includes J1s, J2s, Strats, Les Pauls, and SGs. They also make a new version of the SG Special based on the original as played by Tony Iommi, complete with cross inlays and Magnum 2 pickups. This guitar is available with several options on inlays, finish and a vibrato version as well. It has been a global success with customers around the world. There is a range of basses as well, in SG and Rickenbacker 4000 styles. The Eaton range of guitars was started after John Birch died and was designed, in John Carling's words, to "offer a wider range of products and retain the JB Professional line." There is also a metal-front Eaton range, much like Tony Zemaitis' guitars, that include Les Paul and Telecaster styles. These are now discontinued.

Several models are available with LED lights in the fingerboard inlays. The LED system as used in the SY2 and SG 2002 runs from fibre optic feeds from a single light source in the base of the neck.

In 2013 John Carling devised the next generation of guitar pickups: Hyperflux 3, Hyperflux 4 and Magnum 3. These new pickups now use CEM technology, (Cryogenically-Enhanced Magnets) to improve the dynamics and also at an affordable price, aimed at the aftermarket for customers fitting to generic guitars. A range of retro vintage and Holographic guitars were introduced in 2013 fitted with these new pickups.

Jaydee
John Diggins also continues to make high-quality custom guitars, aided in the shop by his son. He continued to make guitars for Tony Iommi throughout the 1980s and 1990s, including two seven-string SGs. Diggins is also well known for his Supernatural basses as used by Mark King. He has a wide variety of styles, including his Iommi model SG, the Hooligan Superstrat, several jazz guitars, multi-string basses, as well as custom work to the customer's specifications.

Currently Diggins is making a new copy of Tony Iommi's "Old Boy," the original SG made for Iommi in the mid-seventies. This will be an exact copy for Iommi, including the P-90-sized humbuckers made by John Birch until the 1990s, when the new standard humbucker-sized line was released.

References
The Ultimate Guitar Book by Tony Bacon

External links
 John Birch Guitars (U.K.)
 Gibson Flying V guitar - previously owned by Manny Charlton (Nazareth)

1922 births
2000 deaths
British luthiers
Guitar makers
People from West Bridgford
Royal Air Force personnel of World War II
Royal Air Force officers